El castillo de los monstruos may refer to:
 El castillo de los monstruos (1958 film), a  Mexican horror comedy film
 El castillo de los monstruos (1964 film), an Argentine film